Sunshine Records was a Filipino record label owned by Vicor Music Corporation. It was established in the early 1970s by Orly Ilacad, the co-founder of Vicor.

Some of the songs that became hits under the label were "Ang Nobya Kong Sexy" by the APO Hiking Society, "Ang Boyfriend Kong Baduy" by Cinderella in 1976, "Dukha" performed by Judas in 1978, "Pakita Mo" by Archie D. in 1990, & "Kaba" by Tenten Muñoz in 1991.

The label became dormant by 1994 and its artists were moved to its parent Vicor.

Notable artists

Bluejeans
Cinderella
Sharon Cuneta
Helen Gamboa
The Hi-Jacks
Tillie Moreno
Martin Nievera
Rico J. Puno
Randy Santiago
Side A
VST & Company
Basil Valdez
Gary Valenciano
Regine Velasquez
Yoyoy Villame
April Boys
John Melo
Renz Verano
Donna Cruz
Ogie Alcasid
Ima Castro
Lloyd Umali
Jaya
Rockstar 2
Lani Misalucha

References

Philippine record labels
Vicor Music